Stegastes sanctaehelenae is a species of fish in the family Pomacentridae. It is endemic to Saint Helena.

References

Sources

sanctaehelenae
Fauna of Saint Helena Island
Taxa named by Henri Émile Sauvage 
Fish described in 1879
Taxonomy articles created by Polbot